The Ceredigion League (known as The Costcutter Ceredigion League for sponsorship purposes) is a Welsh football league for the county of Ceredigion.  It is at the fifth level of the Welsh football league system.  It was founded in 1921 as the Cardiganshire League in Lampeter. The ten founding teams were Aberaeron, Aberystwyth Battery, Conservative FC, College Reserves, Drefach, Lampeter, Llanybydder, Newcastle Emlyn, Padarn United and Parish Hall United.  Newcastle Emlyn withdrew from the league without playing games.

Member clubs for 2022–23 season

First Division

Bargod Rangers
Cardigan Town
Crannog
Crymych 
Dewi Stars
Felinfach
Ffostrasol Wanderers
Llanboidy
Llandysul
Llechryd
St Dogmaels

Second Division

Aberporth
Aberaeron reserves
Crannog reserves
Ffostrasol Wanderers reserves
Lampeter Town
Maesglas
New Quay
Pencader United
St Dogmaels reserves

Third Division

Bargod Rangers reserves
Crymych reserves
Felinfach reserves
Llanboidy reserves
Llandysul reserves
Llechryd reserves
Maesglas reserves

First Division champions
Information provided from league website  Those years empty are not known.

1920s

1921–22: Llandysul
1922–23: North: Parish Hall United;  South: Llandysul
1923–24: 
1924–25: Bargod Rangers
1925–26: Bargod Rangers
1926–27: Llanbydder
1927–28: 
1928–29: 
1929–30: Newcastle Emlyn

1930s

1930–31: Newcastle Emlyn
1931–32: Bargod Rangers
1932–33: Aberaeron Town
1933–34: 
1934–35: 
1935–36: 
1936–37: 
1937–38: 
1938–39:

1940s

1946–47: Bargod Rangers
1947–48: Newcastle Emlyn
1948–49: Llandysul
1949–50: Cilgerran

1950s

1950–51: uncompleted
1951–52: Llanybydder
1952–53: Aberaeron Town
1953–54: Aberaeron Town
1954–55: Bargod Rangers
1955–56: Aberaeron Town
1956–57: Newcastle Emlyn
1957–58: Bargod Rangers
1958–59: Tregaron
1959–60: Aberaeron Town

1960s

1960–61: St Dogmaels
1961–62: Bargod Rangers
1962–63: Beulah
1963–64: St David's College
1964–65: St Dogmaels
1965–66: St Dogmaels
1966–67: Bargod Rangers
1967–68: Ffostrasol Wanderers
1968–69: Cardigan Town
1989–70: Ffostrasol Wanderers

1970s

1970–71: Ffostrasol Wanderers
1971–72: Ffostrasol Wanderers
1972–73: Bargod Rangers
1973–74: St Dogmaels
1974–75: Ffostrasol Wanderers
1975–76: Newcastle Emlyn
1976–77: Ffostrasol Wanderers
1977–78: Newcastle Emlyn
1978–79: Bargod Rangers
1979–80: Ffostrasol Wanderers

1980s

1980–81: Bargod Rangers
1981–82: Aberaeron
1982–83: Maesglas
1983–84: Newcastle Emlyn
1984–85: Maesglas
1985–86: Newcastle Emlyn
1986–87: Maesglas
1987–88: Newcastle Emlyn
1988–89: Maesglas
1989–90: Newcastle Emlyn

1990s

1990–91: Dewi Stars
1991–92: St Dogmaels
1992–93: St Dogmaels
1993–94: St Dogmaels
1994–95: St Dogmaels
1995–96: Cardigan Town
1996–97: St Dogmaels
1997–98: Dewi Stars
1998–99: Newcastle Emlyn
1999–2000: Cardigan Town

2000s

2000–01: Cardigan Town
2001–02: Aberaeron
2002–03: Cardigan Town
2003–04: Crannog
2004–05: Lampeter Town
2005–06: Lampeter Town
2006–07: St Dogmaels
2007–08: Maesglas
2008–09: Lampeter Town
2009–10: Cardigan Town

2010s

2010–11: New Quay
2011–12: New Quay
2012–13: New Quay
2013–14: Newcastle Emlyn reserves
2014–15: Cardigan Town
2015–16: Cardigan Town
2016–17: St Dogmaels
2017–18: Lampeter Town
2018–19: St Dogmaels
2019–20: St Dogmaels

2020s

2020–21: No competition
2021–22: St Dogmaels
2022–23:

Cup Competitions 
Teams from the Ceredigion League can compete in 6 different cups;

Bay Cup - only 1st teams.
League Cup - only 1st teams and reserve sides that do not have their 1st teams participating in this league (Newcastle Emlyn III, Aberaeron Reserves).
Cwpan Ceredigion - same teams who participate in the League cup, with their equivalent from the Aberystwyth League.
Percy Eldridge Cup - only the reserve sides which have their 1st teams participating in the league (not Newcastle Emlyn III or Aberaeron Reserves).
South Cards Cup - all teams from Division 2 and the teams from the Reserve Cup which do not have their 1st teams in Division 2.
J.Emrys Morgan Cup - same teams who participate in the League Cup, with their equivalent from the Aberystwyth League, Montgomeryshire League and the Mid Wales South League.

References

External links
Ceredigion League: Official website

 
Sport in Ceredigion
1921 establishments in Wales
Sports leagues established in 1921
Wales